Manuel León (born 23 September 1987) is a Guatemalan football midfielder.

He was part of the Guatemala national football team for the 2011 CONCACAF Gold Cup, and played in two matches.

References

1987 births
Living people
Guatemalan footballers
Guatemala international footballers
Association football midfielders
2011 Copa Centroamericana players
2011 CONCACAF Gold Cup players